Castillon-Debats is a commune in the Gers department in southwestern France.

Geography
The Auzoue forms part of the commune's eastern border and flows north through its northeastern part.

Population

See also
Communes of the Gers department

References

Communes of Gers